Dayaram Dahal (born May 27, 1970) is a Nepalese film director, producer, writer, actor, and lyricist. He was one of the country's top-paid directors during the late 1990s, earning approximately Rs. 300,000 per film. He directed 2007 film Nepal, which was the first Nepalese feature film partly shot in the United States.
Dahal was appointed as chairman of Film Development Board of Nepal on June 4, 2020; he served as a chairman till June 3, 2022.

Filmography

Awards

References

External links
 

Nepalese film directors
Living people
21st-century Nepalese film directors
20th-century Nepalese film directors
1970 births